This is a list of South African television-related events in 1976.

Events
5 January - after a year of experimental broadcasts in the main cities, South African Broadcasting Corporation (SABC) television service officially opened nationwide.

Debuts
South Africa's first television soap opera The Dingleys is aired, and is panned by critics and audiences.

Television shows

1970s
Haas Das se Nuuskas (1976–1980)

Ending this year
No shows ending this year.

Births
9 February — Colin Moss, actor and television host

See also
1976 in South Africa

 
South African Television, 1976 In